The 2015 Judo Grand Slam was held in Tyumen, Russia, from 18 to 19 July 2015.

Medal summary

Men's events

Women's events

Source Results

Medal table

References

External links
 

2015 IJF World Tour
2015 Judo Grand Slam
Judo
Grand Slam Tyumen 2015
Judo
Judo